Doka may refer to:
 Doka Group, an international supplier of prefabricated formwork
 Doka, Nigeria, headquarters of Kaduna North Local Government Area
 DOKA Studios, a Russian video game developer and publisher.
 Doka, Sudan, Al Qadarif (state), a village in eastern Sudan
 Doka, a dialect of the Miship language, spoken in Nigeria
 Francisco Lima da Silva, Brazilian footballer nicknamed Doka
 The German name (shortened version of Dopplekabin) for the crew cab / double cab version of a pickup, often used worldwide by the fans of the double cab version of the Volkswagen Type 2 pickup

See also

Donka (disambiguation)